Woolcock is a surname. Notable people with the surname include:

Charles Woolcock (died 1891), 19th century Member of Parliament from Westland, New Zealand
Elizabeth Woolcock (1848–1873), hanged in Adelaide Gaol for the murder of her husband Thomas Woolcock by mercury poisoning
Iris Woolcock, artist, photographer, realtor and adventurer
John Laskey Woolcock (1862–1929), barrister and Supreme Court judge in Queensland, Australia
Penny Woolcock (born 1950), British filmmaker, opera director, and screenwriter
Peter Woolcock (1926–2014) British, born in Argentina, illustrator, political cartoonist in Bermuda, uncle to Penny Woolcock
William Woolcock (1878–1947), Liberal Party politician in England